Tucker Addington (born July 16, 1997) is an American football long snapper for the New England Patriots of the National Football League (NFL). He played college football at Sam Houston State and spent two years out of football before being selected in the 2022 USFL Draft by the Houston Gamblers, where he played one season. He has also been a member of the Dallas Cowboys.

Early life and education
Addington was born on July 16, 1997, in New Braunfels, Texas. He attended Canyon High School, playing two years as a starter on the football team and recording 137 all-purpose yards. He appeared in six games as a senior, and also participated in the discus throw. Addington began attending Sam Houston State University in 2016, and earned the starting long snapper role as a true freshman, appearing in a total of 11 games. He recorded two tackles and one fumble recovery that season.

As a sophomore, Addington appeared in all 14 games, helping Sam Houston State to a 12–2 record and a playoff berth. In his junior season, he played 11 games and recorded three tackles, two of which were solo. As a senior, he helped them compile a record of 7–5 while appearing in all 12 games and recording three tackles and one fumble recovered.

Addington is an alumni of the Texas Long Snapping organization, and while attending it posted the fastest snapping speed of any player there (.65); he was later inducted into their Hall of Honor. From 2020 to 2021, while a free agent in professional football, Addington served as an assistant coach with the organization.

Professional career
Addington went unselected in the 2020 NFL Draft and spent the following two seasons out of professional football, working at the Texas Long Snapping camp. In 2022, he was selected in the sixth round of the 2022 USFL Supplemental Draft by the Houston Gamblers. He appeared in all ten of their games, as the Gamblers compiled a 3–7 record and placed fourth in their division. During the 2022 NFL season, Addington was signed along with Matt Overton to compete for the Dallas Cowboys long snapping position in October, following an injury to Jake McQuaide. Overton won the job and Addington was released about a week after his signing.

On December 14, 2022, Addington was signed to the practice squad of the New England Patriots after Joe Cardona was listed on the injury report. On December 23, he was signed to the active roster after Cardona was placed on injured reserve. He made his debut in Week 16 against the Cincinnati Bengals. Addington played in a total of three games for the Patriots in 2022.

References

External links
New England Patriots bio

1997 births
Living people
American football long snappers
People from New Braunfels, Texas
Players of American football from Texas
Sam Houston Bearkats football players
Houston Gamblers (2022) players
Dallas Cowboys players
New England Patriots players